Florent Parfait Mana is a Malagasy politician. A member of the National Assembly of Madagascar, he was elected as a member of the Tiako I Madagasikara party; he represents the first constituency of Toliary.

References

Living people
Members of the National Assembly (Madagascar)
Tiako I Madagasikara politicians
Year of birth missing (living people)
Place of birth missing (living people)